Paul Bertus was the 11th mayor of New Orleans, Louisiana, serving from April 10, 1838, to May 12, 1838, and again from February 7, 1843, to February 26, 1843.

References

Mayors of New Orleans